Shui may refer to:

Shui people, or Sui people, ethnic group living in southwestern China
Shui language, or Sui language, spoken by the Shui people
Shui (surname) (水), a Chinese surname